Yumoto (written:  or ) is a Japanese surname. Notable people with the surname include:

, Japanese ski jumper
, Japanese screenwriter and novelist
, Japanese sport wrestler
, Japanese artistic gymnast
, Japanese sport wrestler
, Japanese footballer

See also
Yumoto Station, a railway station in Iwaki, Fukushima Prefecture, Japan

Japanese-language surnames